Twinkle, the Dream Being is an American animated television series that aired in 1992 in syndication in the U.S. and MBC TV in South Korea for Daejeon Expo 1993. The show was produced by Zodiac Entertainment, Sei Young Anitel and Calico Entertainment and MBC. One season was produced, with 26 episodes.

Synopsis
Twinkle, the Dream Being (voiced by Tress MacNeille), is a little, yellow wish-granting genie who turns the wishes of the inhabitants of the Land of Possibility into reality. Miss Diva Weed tries to stop him and enslave the population of the Land of Possibility.

Twinkle is accompanied by his intergalactic mercenaries Nova and Wishball as he shows the people that with a little bit of magic, anything is possible. Many of the problems are usually caused by Diva Weed and her ridiculous minions, the Hotshots, as Twinkle in most circumstances tries to help them in any way he can while getting them to stick up and believe in themselves.

This show was the last show created by Calico Creations airing in the US from 1992 to 1993.

Characters
Twinkle (voiced by Tress MacNeille): The title character, an intergalactic genie. 
Nova (voiced by Russi Taylor): A small, blue star creature that lives on Twinkle's head. She acts as his pilot ship. 
Wishball (voiced by Pat Fraley): A small, blue ball creature who works alongside Nova. He helps Twinkle fly around.
Miss Diva Weed (voiced by Tress MacNeille): The main villain of the show. A perverse and wicked witch who feeds off the despair of the people. She does everything to stop Twinkle and his plans.
Won (voiced by Pat Fraley): One of Diva Weeds' Hotshot minions. He's usually serious about trying to get rid of Twinkle, but can befriend him just as easily. 
Chu (voiced by Cam Clarke): Diva Weeds' other Hotshot minion. He's usually accommodated with Won but Chu doesn't take his job all that serious in comparison. He's rather bumbling as pointed out by his peers.
Urg (voiced by Pat Fraley ): A giant rock monster with a large appetite. Most of the other characters are afraid of him because of his appearance, but is otherwise seen as friendly.

Episode list
1. Park Pranksters - December 5, 1992 
2. School is Cool - December 12, 1992 
3. Shopping Mall Shenanigans - December 19, 1992 
4. Calamity Carnival - December 26, 1992
5. Home Sweet Home - January 2, 1993 
6. Way Out Campout - January 9, 1993 
7. Farm Festival Fun - January 16, 1993 
8. Fun Park Fiasco - January 23, 1993 
9. Mountain Madness - January 30, 1993 
10. One Wish, Two Wish - February 6, 1993 
11. Dream Being Birthday - February 13, 1993 
12. All-Star Expo - February 20, 1993 
13. Once Upon An Urg - February 27, 1993 
14. Castle Capers - March 6, 1993 
15. Cosmic Ecology - March 13, 1993 
16. Pollution Solution - March 20, 1993 
17. Aquatic Adventures - March 27, 1993 
18. The Menace Apprentice - April 3, 1993 
19. Book Bash - April 10, 1993 
20. Culture Shock - April 17, 1993 
21. Better Together - April 24, 1993 
22. Energy Escapades - May 1, 1993 
23. Whale Wishing - May 8, 1993 
24. Pets Are Pals - May 15, 1993 
25. Be Safe, Not Sorry - May 22, 1993 
26. Rainforest Romp - June 25, 1993

Alternative titles
 ניצנץ מארץ החלומות (Nitznatz Me'eretz HaHalomot) (Israeli Title)
 Twinkle, die Sternschnuppe (German Title) 
 꿈돌이 (Kumdori) (Korean Title)
 O Mundo Mágico de Pingo (Brazilian Title)
 Блясъчко, мечтателникът (Bulgarian Title)
 Twinkle, el mag dels somnis (Catalan Title)
 البراق محقق الأمنيات (Albiraq Muhaqqaq Al'amniat) (Arabic Title)
 Rayito: El Mago de Los Deseos  (Spanish Title)
 Réaltóg (Irish Title)
 Twinkle, przybysz z krainy marzeń (Polish Title)
 Twinkle, o Mago dos Desejos (Portuguese Title)
 Twinkle, min Drömstjärna (Swedish Title)
 Τουίνκλ, ο Μικρός Εξωγήινος (Touín'kl, o Mikrós Exogíinos) (Greek Title)
 Twinkle, le Faiseur de Rêves (French Title)
 Geisli, Draumálfur (Icelandic Title)

Broadcast UK history
CITV (1994–1997) 
The Children's Channel (1994)

References

External links
 

1990s American animated television series
1990s South Korean animated television series
1992 American television series debuts
1993 American television series endings
1993 South Korean television series endings
American children's animated adventure television series
American children's animated fantasy television series
South Korean children's animated adventure television series
South Korean children's animated fantasy television series
The Family Channel (American TV network, founded 1990) original programming
First-run syndicated television programs in the United States
Genies in television
ITV children's television shows
English-language television shows
Animated television series about extraterrestrial life